Sophie Lefèvre (born 23 February 1981 in Toulouse) is a retired French tennis player.

On 15 September 2003, she reached her career-high WTA ranking of 216 in singles. Her highest doubles ranking was 76, reached on 21 February 2011. Lefèvre retired from the WTA Tour in 2013.

She is co-founder and now director, with former Russian professional Maria Kondratieva, of KL Tennis Academy in Florida, United States.

ITF finals

Singles (0–1)

Doubles (4–7)

References

External links
 
 

1981 births
Living people
French female tennis players
Sportspeople from Toulouse